Events from the year 1736 in Canada.

Incumbents
French Monarch: Louis XV
British and Irish Monarch: George II

Governors
Governor General of New France: Charles de la Boische, Marquis de Beauharnois
Colonial Governor of Louisiana: Jean-Baptiste le Moyne de Bienville
Governor of Nova Scotia: Lawrence Armstrong
Commodore-Governor of Newfoundland: Jean-Baptiste Le Moyne de Bienville

Events

 Father Jean-Pierre Aulneau, Jean Baptiste de La Vérendrye and 19 French voyageurs were headed from Fort St. Charles to Montreal via Fort St. Pierre. On their first night out they were massacred by Sioux warriors on a nearby island in Lake of the Woods. The date was June 8.

Deaths
 March 25 - François-Marie Bissot, Sieur de Vincennes, explorer and soldier (born 1700).

Full date unknown
 Christopher Dufrost de La Jemeraye died May 10 of this year. In ill health he was travelling from Fort Maurepas (Canada) on the Red River to Fort St. Charles on Lake of the Woods. He was buried near the junction of the Red and Rousseau rivers (born 1708).
 Jean Baptiste de La Vérendrye died June 6, the eldest son of Pierre Gaultier de Varennes, sieur de La Vérendrye (born 1713).

Historical documents
"Cape Breton will remain a Thorn in our Sides" - With Cape Breton's troops and Acadians' numbers, French frustrate British in Nova Scotia

Two priests who reject Council orders in "a most Insolent, Audacious & Disrespectfull manner" are ordered to leave Nova Scotia

Doors of "Mass house" up Annapolis River to "be Closly Naild Up" as Council deals with another priest's alleged defiance

"A. does not know what to do" - Lt. Gov. Lawrence Armstrong frustrated that Acadians and Île-Royale governor resist banishment of two priests

Armstrong invokes treaty with Indigenous people near Cape Sable to get their help in case of murder and robbery aboard ship "Baltimore"

Armstrong summarizes evidence to date in curious case of supposed lone survivor left from ship "Baltimore," forced by bad weather into port

Armstrong updates Board of Trade on Baltimore case, suspecting lone witness is lying and that convicts on-board killed crew

When petitioned about plan to reroute rivulet landowners fear will harm them, Council advises community consultation and its own visit to site

Nova Scotia government to be set up with governor, council, courts and (with "competent number of Freemen, planters and inhabitants") assembly

Fewer French in Port-aux-Basques than thought, capital-crime witnesses still evade trip to England, and JPs are better lawmen than admirals

Priest gives general absolution to crew of French ship in fierce November storm, run aground off Anticosti Island (they get to shore)

Map: Cape Sable to Strait of Belle Isle and Gaspé to Grand Banks

George Clarke says New York can be bulwark against French by settling Kanien’kéhà:ka country with thousands of European Protestants

Clarke recommends Assembly fund new fort at "upper End of the Mohauks Country" to "cover" it and provide protective link to Oswego

Penobscot, denying French influence, insist Massachusetts governor must prevent settlement up Saint George River to preserve peace

Detailed proposal for sending two sloops from Churchill to search for passage west out of Hudson Bay and record tides, soundings etc.

Hudson's Bay Company orders ships north along Bay's western shore to establish trade and record details of land and waters

French have no claim to Canada because merely asking Indigenous people for permission to settle gives foreigners right of dominion

At Lake of the Woods, Jesuit priest describes "this wretched country" and "morally degraded" Cree (Note: racial stereotypes)

References 

 
36